Shea Curry is an American actress, who portrayed the lady's maid Brigitte in The Princess Diaries 2: Royal Engagement (2004).

Curry appeared in Broadway's The Little Prince at the Promenade Theatre, New York. She received a Garland Award nomination for Best Actress in a Play 2001 for her role as Blue in Beirut. Her original music is featured on the A & R Network website. Curry also appeared in other Broadway shows such as Showboat (opposite Cloris Leachman and Len Cariou), Can't Stop Dancin''', West Side Story and Evening with Charles Strouse.

Curry's first TV appearance was in a 1998 episode of NBC's One World. She also appeared in Malcolm in the Middle, Lucky, Days of Our Lives, Grounded for Life and Las Vegas. She was filming the American version of The IT Crowd on February 16, 2007, as Emily opposite Joel McHale. She also appeared in  The Hard Times of RJ Berger (2010) as Jenni.

In October 2011, Curry was a contestant on the new Lifetime reality series Project Accessory''.

Filmography

References

External links
 

Actresses from Mississippi
American film actresses
American stage actresses
American television actresses
Living people
People from Hattiesburg, Mississippi
Year of birth missing (living people)
21st-century American women